In Greek mythology, Penthilus (Ancient Greek: Πένθιλος) was a king of Messenia, son of Periclymenus and father of Borus. In early accounts, he was the son of Borus and Lysidice instead. Penthilus married Anchirhoe and became the father of Andropompus, father of King Melanthus of Athens.

Notes

References 

 Pausanias, Description of Greece with an English Translation by W.H.S. Jones, Litt.D., and H.A. Ormerod, M.A., in 4 Volumes. Cambridge, MA, Harvard University Press; London, William Heinemann Ltd. 1918. . Online version at the Perseus Digital Library
 Pausanias, Graeciae Descriptio. 3 vols. Leipzig, Teubner. 1903.  Greek text available at the Perseus Digital Library.

Kings in Greek mythology
Messenian mythology